Uranga is a surname. Notable people with the surname include:

Amaya Uranga (born 1947), Spanish singer, member of the Basque folk/pop sextet Mocedades
Emilio Uranga (1921–1988), Mexican philosopher
Enoé Uranga (born 1963), Mexican politician
Estíbaliz Uranga (born 1952), Spanish singer, member of the folk group Mocedades
Gari Uranga (born 1980), Spanish retired footballer
Ian Uranga (born 1987), Spanish footballer
Iban Iriondo Uranga or Iban Iriondo (born 1984), Spanish professional road bicycle racer
Izaskun Uranga (born 1950), Spanish musician, formed the Spanish folk group Mocedades
José Antonio de la Hoz Uranga (born 1949), Spanish retired footballer
Maria de los Remedios Varo Uranga or Remedios Varo (1908–1963), Spanish-Mexican, para-surrealist painter and anarchist
Martín Uranga (born 1980), former Argentine footballer playing for clubs of Argentina, Chile and El Salvador
Mikel Zarrabeitia Uranga (born 1970), Spanish former road bicycle racer
Nancy Uranga (1954–1976), Cuban fencer
Pablo Uranga (1861–1934), Spanish painter born in Gasteiz

See also
Uranga, Santa Fe, small town in Santa Fe, Argentina
Raúl Uranga – Carlos Sylvestre Begnis Subfluvial Tunnel, an underwater road tunnel that connects Entre Ríos and Santa Fe in Argentina
Uranga-o-te-rā, the fifth lowest level of the underworld, ruled by Rohe, the wife of Māui
Ranga (disambiguation)
Suranga
Urana
Urangela